Vinukonda is a town in Palnadu district of the Indian state of Andhra Pradesh. It is a municipality and the headquarters of Vinukonda mandal and administered under Narasaraopet revenue division.

Etymology 
The town was formerly known as Vishnukundinapuram. Many temples are also found on the top of hill. Srigangasametha Ramalingeswara Swamy temple (according to available sources the deity present in temple was sanctified by Lord Rama). Down the hill Sri Lakshmi Narasimha Swamy temple was found which was constructed in Gupta's rule.

History 
Dolmens and other megalithic structures have been found in the town's neighbourhood. Inscriptions from about 1000–1400 CE are also to be found in many old temples. The Vishnukundinas, a local dynasty, ruled the adjoining areas from here during the turn of the millennium. During the medieval era, the hill nearby was the site of a fortress. A four-hundred-year-old Jamia Masjid, built in 1640, is the only major relic of Muslim rule in the town.

Geography 
It has an average elevation of 75 metres (246 feet). Much like the rest of Palnadu district, it has very hot summers and mild winters. Rainfall is mostly in July to September. High concentrations of fluorides are found in the underground water reserves and potable water is therefore rare. Summer storage tank is the source of drinking water for the village.

Demographics 
The town had a population of 60,420 and an urban agglomeration population of 63,450.

Governance 
Vinukonda municipality is the civic administrative body of the city. The urban agglomeration constituents of the town are Vinukonda municipality and a partial out growth of Brahmanapalle village. The current Member of Legislative Assembly representing Vinukonda town area is Bolla Brahma Naidu from the YSRCP.

Transport 
It is located on Guntur–Kurnool–Bellary highway. Vinukonda railway station is located on the – railway line and falls under the Guntur railway division of South Central Railway.

Education 
The primary and secondary school education is imparted by government, aided and private schools, under the School Education Department of the state. The medium of instruction followed by different schools are English and Telugu.

References

External links 

Forts in Andhra Pradesh
Towns in Guntur district
Mandal headquarters in Guntur district
Buddhist pilgrimage sites in India
Villages in Guntur district
Tourist attractions in Guntur district
Ancient Indian cities
Former capital cities in India